Amelia Flanagan (born 6 June 2008) is an English actress who has appeared as April Windsor in the ITV soap opera Emmerdale since 2014.

Early and personal life
Flanagan was born in Leeds, West Yorkshire, to parents Rachel and Chris Flanagan. Her younger twin siblings, Isabella and William, have been playing the roles of cousins Hope Stape and Joseph Brown in Coronation Street since 2017.

Awards and nominations

References

External links
 

2008 births
Living people
English television actresses
English soap opera actresses
English child actresses
21st-century English actresses
Actresses from Leeds